Kaidan Shin Mimibukuro: Yūrei Mansion (Tales of Terror: The Haunted Apartment) is a Japanese horror film of the Tales of Terror from Tokyo and All Over Japan television and film series.

Plot 
Aimi, a teenage girl and her alcoholic father move into an old, apartment building. Her mother died two years ago in an accident, and her father hasn't been able to recover from the incident. Things soon become worse as the two learn that the apartment is haunted. The landlord warns Aimi and her father of the rules. The first rule being that no one can move out until a new tenant arrives. The second rule is whenever a resident leaves and returns to the building, they must cross the rope in front of the property by midnight, or if they fail to return during the given curfew, then they will suffer a horrible death by a mysterious force. Aimi soon begins to see visions of a girl who doesn't exist. She learns that the girl is named Ai, and lived in the apartment 30 years ago, but mysteriously vanished one day on her way home from school. Aimi finds out the secret of being sexually abused by their fathers that the two girls share. Ai kills Aimi's father.

Cast

Kurokawa Mei as Aimi Yamato Protagonist

Maeda Ayaka as Ai Takamatsu The Ghost Antagonist 
Turn Anti Heroine

Fukikoshi Mitsuru as Mr Yamato & Aimi Father Antagonist

References

External links
 

2005 films
2005 horror films
2005 psychological thriller films
2000s teen horror films
Films based on horror novels
Films directed by Hideo Nakata
Japanese ghost films
Japanese haunted house films
Incest in film
Japanese horror films
Japanese supernatural horror films
2000s Japanese films